The 2019 Gree-Tour of Guangxi was a road cycling stage race that took place between 17 and 22 October 2019 in the Chinese province of Guangxi. It was the 3rd edition of the Tour of Guangxi and the thirty-eighth and final event of the 2019 UCI World Tour.

Teams
Eighteen teams, which consist of fifteen of the eighteen UCI WorldTour teams and three UCI Professional Continental teams, participated in the race. Of the 123 riders that started the race, only 118 finished.

UCI WorldTeams

 
 
 
 
 
 
 
 
 
 
 
 
 
 
 
 

UCI Professional Continental teams

Route

Stages

Stage 1
17 October 2019 — Beihai to Beihai,

Stage 2
18 October 2019 — Beihai to Qinzhou,

Stage 3
19 October 2019 — Nanning to Nanning,

Stage 4
20 October 2019 — Nanning to Mashan Nongla Scenic Spot,

Stage 5
21 October 2019 — Liuzhou to Guilin,

Stage 6
22 October 2019 — Guilin to Guilin,

Classification leadership

Classification standings

General classification

Points classification

Mountains classification

Young rider classification

Teams classification

References

2019 UCI World Tour
2019 in Chinese sport
2019
October 2019 sports events in China